Jean-Marie D'Haese (born 7 June 1949) is a Belgian sprint canoer who competed in the early 1970s. He was eliminated in the semifinals of the K-4 1000 m event at the 1972 Summer Olympics in Munich.

References
Sports-reference.com profile

1949 births
Belgian male canoeists
Canoeists at the 1972 Summer Olympics
Living people
Olympic canoeists of Belgium
Place of birth missing (living people)